Apotekarnes Cola was a cola-flavoured soft drink produced in Sweden by Pripps/Carlsberg Sverige.

Pripps held the license to sell Coca-Cola until the late 1990s when this license was lost. The other soft drink flavours of the Pripps brewery - such as julmust, sockerdricka and hallonmust - had been using the brand Apotekarnes ("the Pharmacists"), and this brand was also used for the cola that replaced Coca-Cola. Apotekarnes Cola was distributed by Pripps (later merged into Carlsberg Sverige) until they got the license to produce Pepsi-Cola in Sweden.

See also
List of defunct consumer brands

External links
Soft Drinks At The Touch Of A Button

Cola brands
Swedish drinks
Defunct drink brands